The black-winged ground dove (Metriopelia melanoptera) is a species of bird in the family Columbidae. It is found in Argentina, Bolivia, Chile, Colombia, Ecuador, and Peru.

Taxonomy and systematics

The black-winged ground dove has two subspecies, the nominate M. m. melanoptera and M. m. saturatior.

Description

Males weigh  and females . The nominate adult male is grayish brown or earth brown above with a faint pink tinge. The throat is whitish and the underparts fawn pink with gray flanks. The closed wing shows a white edge and some pale gray. The eye color is highly variable as is the bare skin that surrounds it. The adult female's upperparts are a duller brown than the male's and the underparts less pink. Juveniles do not have the adults' pink tinge, and many feathers have buff edges. M. m. saturatior differs from the nominate by being darker and grayer above and less pink below.

Distribution and habitat

The nominate subspecies of black-winged ground dove is a year round resident from central Peru and adjacent Bolivia south through most of Chile and western Argentina. It breeds but does not winter on Tierra del Fuego. M. m. saturatior is found in the Andes of southwestern Colombia south to Ecuador's Azuay Province.

The black-winged ground dove inhabits páramo in Colombia and Ecuador and puna in Peru, Bolivia, Chile, and Argentina. It is typically found in grassy areas near treeline but roosts in Polylepis woodland and Puya stands. It moves to the lower elevations in winter.

Behavior

Feeding

The black-winged ground dove feeds on the ground in small flocks. Its primary food appears to be grass seeds but details are lacking.

Breeding

The black-winged ground dove's breeding season varies with latitude. In Colombia and Ecuador, eggs have been found between August and October. In the south the season continues past October to February. Its nest is a fragile platform of sticks, usually in bushes, bromeliads, or cacti but sometimes on the ground. The clutch size is two.

Vocalization

The black-winged ground dove's song is a "series of relatively high-pitched, double notes 'rrree-up...rrree-up...rrreee-up...'." It also gives a short "piu" call.

Status

The IUCN has assessed the black-winged ground dove as being of Least Concern. It "[a]ppears to be generally common and locally numerous" and its bleak habitat is not heavily affected by humans except by cutting of Polylepis for firewood.

References

black-winged ground dove
Birds of the Ecuadorian Andes
Birds of the Puna grassland
Birds of Chile
Birds of the Southern Andes
Birds of Tierra del Fuego
black-winged ground dove
Taxonomy articles created by Polbot